JBJ95 is a South Korean duo consisting of Kenta Takada and Kim Sang-gyun. The duo was originally formed and managed by Star Road Entertainment and Hunus Entertainment in 2018, before being exclusively managed by Star Road Entertainment. JBJ95 debuted on October 30, 2018 with the single Home.

History

2018: Formation and debut

Shortly after JBJ disbanded, it was revealed that Sanggyun and Kenta would continue to collaborate, starring together in a web drama produced jointly by Star Road Entertainment and SBS called Barefoot Diva. Both Sanggyun and Kenta also released a song called Picture for the Barefoot Diva: OST album. 

During a joint fan-meeting held in Seoul on July 7, 2018, Sanggyun and Kenta announced that they would be forming a permanent duo, with its name yet to be decided.  On August 17, the duo officially revealed their name, JBJ95, a title which commemorates JBJ while also referring to their mutual birth year of 1995.

JBJ95 held their debut showcase on October 30, 2018, following the release of their first EP entitled Home.

2019–2020: Awake, Spark, digital single "Only One", and Jasmin
On March 10, 2019, it was announced that Sanggyun had exited Hunus Entertainment and signed an exclusive contract with Star Road Entertainment, making JBJ95 exclusively managed by Star Road.  Their second EP, Awake, was released on March 26, 2019 at a Seoul Showcase.  Following promotions for the EP, it was announced that Sanggyun was cast in an upcoming KBS drama called Let Me Hear Your Song, set to broadcast in July 2019.

On August 6, 2019, JBJ95 released their third EP, Spark, with the title track of the same name. They released a digital single "Only One" on December 6, 2019.

On October 28, 2020, JBJ95 released their fourth EP, Jasmin, with the title track of the same name.

2021–present: Ongoing lawsuit
On April 14, 2021, JBJ95 announced that they would be filing a lawsuit against Star Road Entertainment to terminate their contracts, citing lack of management and payment issues.

Members
 Kenta Takada (타카다 켄타/髙田健太) – main vocal
 Kim Sang-gyun (김상균) – rap

Discography

Extended plays

Singles

Soundtrack appearances

Filmography
 Produce 101 (season 2) (2017) - Contestants
 Barefoot Diva (2018) - Sang-gyun as Lee Joon-kyung; Kenta as Haru
 My Neighbor, Charles (Ep. 163, 2018) - Kenta and Sanggyun, documentary and interview
 "I Wanna Hear Your Song" (2019) - Sang-gyun as Moon Jae-hyeong
•"Idol Recipe" (2021) - Kenta as Moon Jongup

References

K-pop music groups
South Korean musical duos
South Korean dance music groups
Musical groups from Seoul
Musical groups established in 2018
2018 establishments in South Korea
South Korean pop music groups